Phosphatidylinositol glycan anchor biosynthesis, class N is a protein that in humans is encoded by the PIGN gene.

Function 

This gene encodes a protein that is involved in glycosylphosphatidylinositol (GPI)-anchor biosynthesis. The GPI-anchor is a glycolipid found on many blood cells and serves to anchor proteins to the cell surface. This protein is expressed in the endoplasmic reticulum and transfers phosphoethanolamine (EtNP) to the first mannose of the GPI anchor.

Clinical aspect
Mutations in PIGN cause Congenital Diaphragmatic Hernia.

References

Further reading